Daniel Kunce (born 17 July 1971) is a Czech-born ice hockey player representing Germany, where he was based at club level for almost his entire career. He competed in the men's tournaments at the 1998 Winter Olympics and the 2002 Winter Olympics. His twin brother Jiří and son Daniel Jr also played the sport at a high level.

Career statistics

Regular season and playoffs

International

References

External links
 

1971 births
German ice hockey defencemen
Czechoslovak emigrants to Germany
Czechoslovak ice hockey defencemen
HC Olomouc players
Ice hockey players at the 1998 Winter Olympics
Ice hockey players at the 2002 Winter Olympics
Krefeld Pinguine players
Living people
Olympic ice hockey players of Germany
People from Šumperk
Sportspeople from the Olomouc Region
Czech ice hockey defencemen
ESV Kaufbeuren players
Nürnberg Ice Tigers players
Frankfurt Lions players
Füchse Duisburg players
Czech twins
German twins
Twin sportspeople